Lisignoli Bluff is a rock bluff,  high, forming the north end of the Schneider Hills in the Argentina Range of the Pensacola Mountains, Antarctica. It was mapped by the United States Geological Survey from surveys and U.S. Navy air photos, 1956–67, and was named by the Advisory Committee on Antarctic Names for Argentine glaciologist Cesar Augusto Lisignoli, scientific leader at Ellsworth Station, winter 1961.

References

Cliffs of Queen Elizabeth Land